Fred Hersch at Maybeck: Maybeck Recital Hall Series Volume Thirty-One is an album of solo performances by jazz pianist Fred Hersch.

Music and recording 
The album was recorded at the Maybeck Recital Hall in Berkeley, California in October 1993. The material is "several well-worn pop standards, a few jazz tunes, and a couple of originals".

Release and reception 

The Penguin Guide to Jazz concluded that the album "might not be his finest hour, but it sets up a near-perfect balance of his meditative and argumentative sides". The AllMusic reviewer described it as "another classy, technically unimpeachable, spotlessly recorded outing in the Maybeck series."

Track listing 
"Embraceable You"
"Haunted Heart"
"You Don't Know What Love Is"
"In Walked Bud"
"If I Loved You"
"Heartsong"
"Ev'rything I Love"
"Sarabande"
"The Song Is You"
"Ramblin'"
"Body and Soul"

Personnel 
 Fred Hersch – piano

References 

Albums recorded at the Maybeck Recital Hall
Solo piano jazz albums